Francesco Ruberto (born 19 March 1993 in Sambiase) is an Italian–Swiss footballer who plays as a goalkeeper for FC Schaffhausen. Ruberto is of Italian descent.

References

External links
Francesco Ruberto at Facebook
Francesco Ruberto at Football transfers

1993 births
Living people
Italian footballers
Swiss men's footballers
Swiss people of Italian descent
Swiss people of Calabrian descent
Association football goalkeepers
Footballers from Calabria
People from Lamezia Terme
Swiss Super League players
Swiss Challenge League players
Second Professional Football League (Bulgaria) players
BSC Young Boys players
FC Thun players
OFC Pirin Blagoevgrad players
FC Schaffhausen players
Expatriate footballers in Bulgaria
Swiss expatriate sportspeople in Bulgaria
Sportspeople from the Province of Catanzaro